This is a list of events in British radio during 1979.

Events

January
27 January – BBC Radio 2's last closedown at 02:02. Sarah Kennedy is at the Newsdesk after Brian Matthew finishes "Round Midnight". From 02:00 to 05:00 the following night, listeners hear "You and the Night and the Music". Radio 2 has the longest period of continuous broadcasting of any national radio station in the UK.
29 January – BBC Radio 1 begins its delayed weeknight mid-evening programme with Andy Peebles joining to host the new programme. It had originally been scheduled to launch on 13 November 1978 but was delayed as a result of trade union disputes.

February
No events

March
No events

April
1 April – The first edition of Feedback is broadcast on BBC Radio 4.

May
No events

June
No events

July
No events

August
No events

September
2 September – Tony Blackburn replaces Simon Bates as host of Radio 1's Top 40 show.

October
 5 October – The Scottish Gaelic service  launches, broadcasting to north west Scotland from Stornoway.

November
November – A weekday mind-morning programme launches on BBC Radio Cymru, thereby extending its broadcasting hours to 65 hours each week. Previously, apart from extended news bulletins at lunchtime and early evening, and some off-peak opt-outs, the station had only been on air at breakfast time.

December
16 December – After a decade on air, United Biscuits closes down its internal radio station United Biscuits Network due to it being seen as no longer necessary to operate a radio station due to the rollout of independent commercial stations.

Station debuts
 11 September – BBC Radio Foyle

Closing this year
 16 December – United Biscuits Network (1970–1979)

Programme debuts
 1 April – Feedback on BBC Radio 4 (1979–Present)
 7 July – Science in Action on BBC World Service (1979–Present)
 29 September – Breakaway on BBC Radio 4 (1979–1998)
 30 September – The Food Programme on BBC Radio 4 (1979–Present)

Continuing radio programmes

1940s
 Sunday Half Hour (1940–2018)
 Desert Island Discs (1942–Present)
 Down Your Way (1946–1992)
 Letter from America (1946–2004)
 Woman's Hour (1946–Present)
 A Book at Bedtime (1949–Present)

1950s
 The Archers (1950–Present)
 The Today Programme (1957–Present)
 Sing Something Simple (1959–2001)
 Your Hundred Best Tunes (1959–2007)

1960s
 Farming Today (1960–Present)
 In Touch (1961–Present)
 The World at One (1965–Present)
 The Official Chart (1967–Present)
 Just a Minute (1967–Present)
 The Living World (1968–Present)
 The Organist Entertains (1969–2018)

1970s
 PM (1970–Present)
 Start the Week (1970–Present)
 Week Ending (1970–1998)
 You and Yours (1970–Present)
 I'm Sorry I Haven't a Clue (1972–Present)
 Good Morning Scotland (1973–Present)
 Kaleidoscope (1973–1998)
 Newsbeat (1973–Present)
 The News Huddlines (1975–2001)
 The Burkiss Way (1976–1980)
 File on 4 (1977–Present)
 Money Box (1977–Present)
 The News Quiz (1977–Present)

Ending this year
 11 November – Hello Cheeky (BBC Radio 2) (1973–1979)
 The Enchanting World of Hinge and Bracket (BBC Radio 4) (1977–1979)

Births
 8 March – Zena McNally, singer and radio presenter
 9 March – Adele Roberts, disc jockey
 4 May – Wes Butters, radio presenter
 8 September – Miles Jupp, comedy performer
 Unknown
 Anna Foster, BBC radio presenter
 Lucy Horobin, Heart radio presenter

Deaths
 23 February – Albert Modley, comedy entertainer, 77
 9 September – Ronnie Taylor, broadcast comedy scriptwriter and producer, 58
 27 September – Gracie Fields, singer and actress, BBC and Radio Luxembourg broadcaster, 81 
 8 November – Sydney Tafler, actor, 63
 30 November – Joyce Grenfell, actress, comedian and singer, 69
 December – Peter Eton, broadcast producer, 62

See also 
 1979 in British music
 1979 in British television
 1979 in the United Kingdom
 List of British films of 1979

References

Radio
British Radio, 1979 In
Years in British radio